, a Gato-class submarine, was the first ship of the United States Navy to be named for the Harder, a fish of the mullet family found off South Africa. One of the most famous submarines of World War II, she received the Presidential Unit Citation. Her commanding officer throughout her service, the resolute and resourceful Commander Samuel D. Dealey (1906–1944), "a submariner's submariner", was posthumously awarded the Medal of Honor, as well as four Navy Crosses during his lifetime.

Construction and commissioning
Harder′s keel was laid down by the Electric Boat Company in Groton, Connecticut, on 1 December 1941. She was launched on 19 August 1942, sponsored by Miss Helen M. Shaforth, daughter of Rear Admiral John M. Shaforth, and commissioned on 2 December 1942.

Operational history
Harder performed shakedown off the United States East Coast, then headed for Pearl Harbor, Hawaii, via the Panama Canal. She flashed that day′s recognition signal at the PBY, which responded by opening machine-gun fire along Harder′s starboard side. As Harder crash-dived and made a hard turn to port, the PBY dropped two bombs, the first of which shook Harder. Harder was able to continue her voyage to Pearl Harbor.

First War Patrol
After a short stay at Pearl Harbor, Harder departed on her first war patrol on 7 June 1943. Cruising off the coast of Japan, the submarine worked her way inside a picket line and sighted her first target 22 June. She made a radar approach on the surface and fired four torpedoes at the two-ship convoy, hitting the seaplane transport Sagara Maru (7189 BRT) (which was beached to prevent sinking, but later destroyed). She returned to Midway 7 July.

Second War Patrol
Harder began her second war patrol 24 August 1943 from Pearl Harbor, and after touching at Midway Island, she again headed for the Japanese coast. While patrolling off Honshū on 9 September, she attacked and sank Koyo Maru and later that night ran by an escort ship at a range of  without being detected. Two days later the submarine encountered a convoy. After running ahead to improve her firing position, she sank the cargo ship Yoko Maru with a spread of three torpedoes. Continuing her patrol, Harder sighted two more ships 13 September, but she was forced down by enemy planes while firing torpedoes. Escorts kept the submarine down with a severe depth charge attack which lasted for over two days and almost exhausted her batteries. After evading the Japanese ships, Harder detected her next target 19 September; a torpedo sent Kachisan Maru to the bottom almost immediately. Though running in bad weather, Harder continued to find good targets. On 23 September she sank the 4,500 ton freighter Kowa Maru and the 5,800 ton tanker Daishin Maru, off Nagoya Bay. Her torpedoes expended, Harder turned eastward 28 September. After shooting up two armed trawlers 29 September, she touched Midway 4 October and arrived Pearl Harbor four days later.

Third War Patrol
Departing 30 October 1943 for the Mariana Islands, Harder encountered a target 12 November. Promptly dispatching this one, she surfaced and sighted a trawler-escort damaged by the explosion of one of her own depth charges. Submerging again until sunset, the submarine sank the damaged ship with gunfire, then turned toward Saipan in search of new targets. Sighting three marus on 19 November, she radioed her companions and closed for attack. After passing close by an escorting destroyer, Harder fired six torpedoes at two ships, sinking Udo Maru. As depth charges began to fall, she pressed the attack; two more torpedoes finished Hokko Maru. Harder climbed to periscope depth after nightfall to finish off the third maru. Shortly before midnight, she fired several more shots at 6,000-ton Nikkō Maru, but the Japanese ship stubbornly refused to sink. A brave, but doomed, enemy crew kept the cargo ship afloat until Harder had expended all torpedoes, many of which ran erratically. Rough weather the next day finally sank the damaged target. Harder returned to Pearl Harbor on 30 November, then sailed to the Mare Island Naval Shipyard for overhaul.

Fourth War Patrol

She headed for the western Caroline Islands where she was assigned duty as lifeguard ship for downed aviators. During American air strikes against Woleai on 1 April, Harder received word of an injured pilot awaiting rescue from the beach of a small enemy-held island west of Woleai. Protected by air cover, she nosed against a reef, maintained her position with both propellers, and sent a boat ashore through breaking surf. Despite Japanese snipers, boiling shoals, and the precarious position of the submarine, the daring rescue succeeded, and the intrepid submarine returned to the open sea.

On 13 April an enemy plane sighted Harder north of the western Carolines and reported her position to the patrolling Japanese destroyer Ikazuchi.  As the enemy ship closed to within  Harder fired a spread of torpedoes that sank the attacker within five minutes. Dealey's terse report became famous—"Expended four torpedoes and one Jap destroyer." Four days later Harder spotted a merchant ship escorted by destroyers. Firing four torpedoes, she sank the 7,000 ton Matsue Maru and damaged one of the escorts. Then, adding to the enemy's misery, she returned to Woleai where she surfaced on the morning of 20 April to deliver a shore bombardment under cover of a rain squall. She terminated this highly varied and successful patrol at Fremantle submarine base, Western Australia 3 May.

Fifth War Patrol: Philippine Mission
Even greater successes lay ahead. Having sunk one destroyer, Harder joined the all-out hunt against Japanese destroyers, once considered the most dangerous of foes.

On 6 June Harder entered the heavily patrolled Sibutu Passage between Tawi-Tawi and North Borneo and encountered a convoy of three tankers and two destroyers. She gave chase on the surface but was illuminated by the moon. Two struck Minazuki and exploded; the destroyer sank within five minutes. After attacking the second escort without success, Harder was held down by a depth charge attack while the convoy escaped.

Early next morning an enemy plane spotted Harder. The submarine soon sighted another destroyer searching the area for her. As before, Harder took the initiative as the enemy closed the range. The sub fired three torpedoes at short range, and two of them struck amidships, one detonating the ship's magazine with a tremendous explosion. Hayanami sank a minute later. Following the inevitable depth charge attack, Harder transited the Sibutu Passage after dark and steamed to the northeast coast of Borneo. There on the night of 8 June she picked up six Australian Coastwatchers, and early next day she headed once more for Sibutu Passage.

That evening Harder sighted two enemy destroyers patrolling the narrowest part of the passage, just a few miles from Tawi-Tawi. After submerging, she made an undetected approach and at  fired four torpedoes at the overlapping targets. The second and third torpedoes blasted Tanikaze; she sank almost immediately, her boilers erupting with a terrific explosion. The fourth shot hit the second ship, which exploded with a blinding flash. Within minutes Harder surfaced to survey the results, but both ships had disappeared. Soon afterward, she underwent the inevitable depth charge attack by enemy planes, then she set course for a point south of Tawi-Tawi to reconnoiter.

On the afternoon of 10 June Harder sighted a large Japanese task force, including three battleships and four cruisers with screening destroyers. An overhead plane spotted the submarine at periscope depth and a screening escort promptly steamed at  toward her position. Once again, Harder became the aggressive adversary. The deafening explosions shook the submarine far worse than the depth charges and aerial bombs which the infuriated enemy dropped during the next two hours. When she surfaced, Harder saw only a lighted buoy marking the spot where the unidentified destroyer either sank or was heavily damaged.

Harder reconnoitered Tawi-Tawi anchorage 11 June and sighted additional enemy cruisers and destroyers. At 16:00 she headed for the open sea and that night transmitted her observations which were of vital importance to Admiral Raymond A. Spruance's fleet prior to the decisive Battle of the Philippine Sea. Harder steamed to Darwin on 21 June for additional torpedoes, and, after patrolling the Flores Sea south of the Celebes Islands (with Admiral Ralph Christie aboard), she ended the patrol at Darwin on 3 July.

The important results of Harders fifth war patrol have caused some to call it the most brilliant of the war. Not only did Harder further deplete the critical supply of destroyers by sinking four of them and heavily damaging or destroying another one in four days, but her frequent attacks and a rash of enemy contact reports on this fleeting marauder so frightened Admiral Soemu Toyoda that he believed Tawi-Tawi surrounded by submarines. As a result, Admiral Jisaburo Ozawa's Mobile Fleet departed Tawi-Tawi a day ahead of schedule. The premature departure upset the Japanese battle plans, and forced Ozawa to delay his carrier force in the Philippine Sea, thus contributing to the stunning defeat suffered by the Japanese in the ensuing battle.

Harder's radioman, Calvin Bull, was awarded a Bronze Star medal for his role in sinking the five destroyers.

Sixth War Patrol
Assigned to the South China Sea off Luzon, the wolf pack headed northward. The Japanese lost four passenger-cargo marus, possibly one by Harder.

Battle of Dasol Bay
Early the next day, Harder and Haddo attacked and destroyed three coastal defense vessels off Bataan, Harder sinking frigates Matsuwa and Hiburi; then, joined by Hake that night, they headed for Caiman Point, Luzon. Enemy trawlers towed the stricken destroyer to Dasol Bay, and Haddo, her torpedoes expended, informed Harder and Hake the following night of the attack and left the wolf-pack for replenishment at Biak.

Harder and Hake remained off Dasol Bay, searching for new targets. Before dawn 24 August two ships were spotted which they initially identified as a Japanese minesweeper and the three-stack Siamese destroyer Phra Ruang. The two ships were later discovered to be the Japanese Type D escort ship CD-22 and the very unusual destroyer: PB-102 flying the Japanese flag. While under repair in drydock at Surabaya in February 1942, the Japanese captured the airfield at Bali, thus threatening the naval base and so the ship was scuttled at the docks early in World War II. The Japanese Navy discovered the wreck, and raised, repaired, and recommissioned it into Japanese service in 1943 as Patrol Boat 102. (Incorrect. See para above)

As Hake closed to attack, the destroyer turned away toward Dasol Bay. Hake broke off her approach, turned northward, and then sighted Harder'''s periscope about  dead ahead. To escape the charging escort, Hake started deep and rigged for silent running. At 07:28 she heard 15 rapid depth charges explode in the distance astern. She continued evasive action that morning, then returned to the general area of the attack shortly after noon. She swept the area at periscope depth but found only a ring of marker buoys covering a radius of one-half mile.

The vigorous depth charge attack had sunk the Harder with all hands. The Japanese report of the attack concluded that "much oil, wood chips, and cork floated in the vicinity." The United States Navy declared her lost January 2, 1945.

Dubbed "Hit 'Em Harder," she had wreaked havoc among Japanese shipping. Her record of aggressive daring exploits became almost legendary. All six of her patrols were designated successful.Harder received six battle stars and the Presidential Unit Citation for World War II service. In accordance with Navy custom, the citation was presented to the second Harder upon commissioning.

Despite the losses of 9 more submarines in the fall of 1944, towards the end of the war U.S. fleet boats were actively penetrating through the Inland Sea, and the Japanese shipping losses continued, albeit at a slower rate.Harder's skipper left behind a wife and three children.

==Excerpt from USS Harders log==

 References 

Bibliography

Hinman, Charles R., and Douglas E. Campbell. The Submarine Has No Friends: Friendly Fire Incidents Involving U.S. Submarines During World War II. Syneca Research Group, Inc., 2019. .

PB-102 Tabular Record of Movement at combinedfleet.com

Further readingSilent Running: My Years on a World War II Attack Submarine by Vice Admiral James F. Calvert for a fellow submariner's view of USS Harder'' and her crew.

External links 
On Eternal Patrol: USS Harder

Gato-class submarines
World War II submarines of the United States
Lost submarines of the United States
World War II shipwrecks in the South China Sea
Shipwrecks of the Philippines
Shipwrecks in the South China Sea
Ships built in Groton, Connecticut
1942 ships
Friendly fire incidents of World War II
Maritime incidents in May 1943
Maritime incidents in August 1944
Ships lost with all hands
Submarines sunk by Japanese warships